Svatá Maří is a municipality and village in Prachatice District in the South Bohemian Region of the Czech Republic. It has about 600 inhabitants.

Administrative parts
Villages of Brdo, Smrčná, Štítkov, Trhonín and Vícemily are administrative parts of Svatá Maří.

Etymology
Svatá Maří was named after the church consecrated to Saint Mary Magdalene (in Czech popularly called svatá Maří Magdaléna).

Geography
It lies in the Bohemian Forest Foothills, the southern tip of the municipal territory extends into the Bohemian Forest.

History
The first written mention of Svatá Maří is from 1352 as S. Marie in Laz. The name Svatá Maří was first documented in 1543.

References

External links

Villages in Prachatice District
Bohemian Forest